The streaked weaver (Ploceus manyar) is a species of weaver bird found in South Asia and South-east Asia in the countries of Bangladesh, Bhutan, Cambodia, China, Egypt, India, Indonesia, Myanmar, Nepal, Pakistan, Singapore, Sri Lanka, Thailand, Vietnam and also introduced in Qatar and United Arab Emirates (UAE). These are not as common as the baya weaver but are similar looking but have streaked underparts.

They nest in small colonies often in reed beds near water bodies.

References

streaked weaver
Birds of South Asia
Birds of Southeast Asia
streaked weaver